The Switzerland men's national basketball team represents Switzerland in international basketball. The managing body for the national team is Swiss Basketball.

Switzerland has competed at five EuroBasket tournaments (1935, 1946, 1951, 1953, 1955) in their history. The national team has also made three appearances at the Olympic Games (1936, 1948, 1952). However, Switzerland has struggled over the past decades to once again qualify to international competitions. They also continue their pursuit to clinch their debut trip to the FIBA World Cup.

History

EuroBasket 1935
Switzerland hosted the first European Basketball Championship in Geneva at EuroBasket 1935. The national team finished fourth in the ten team tournament, defeating Romania and Italy in the preliminary round to advance to the semifinals. There they lost to Latvia, resulting in a playoff for third place against Czechoslovakia which the Swiss lost 25–23.

EuroBasket 1946
Switzerland did not play in the European championship again until the post-war, at EuroBasket 1946, which they hosted. There, they placed second in their three-team preliminary group after losing to the eventual champions Czechoslovakia 20–17, but defeating Belgium 38–33.  That preliminary round finish put the Swiss into a 5th/6th place playoff against the Netherlands, which Switzerland won 36–25.

EuroBasket 1951
The next Swiss entry into the European Basketball Championship was at the EuroBasket 1951 tournament in Paris. Switzerland finished the preliminary round with a 1–3 record, 4th in their group. They fared little better in the first classification, taking 3rd in the group with a 1–2 record. In the second classification round, the Swiss won the classification 13-16 and 13/14 games to finish in 13th place of 18 teams, with a 4–5 record.

EuroBasket 1953
EuroBasket 1953 in Moscow was the fourth appearance of the Swiss.  The tournament began poorly for the team, as they finished last in their preliminary pool at 0–3.  It got somewhat better for them after that, as they took second in their first classification pool with 2 wins and a loss.  They dropped their 9-12 semifinal to Belgium, but defeated Finland in the 11/12 final to take 11th of 17 overall.

EuroBasket 1955
Switzerland competed next at the EuroBasket 1955 tournament in Budapest.  Their 2–2 record in preliminary round put them in 3rd of the five-team group and relegated them to the classification rounds.  They had similar results there, again taking a 2–2 record and 3rd of 5 teams.  They won their classification 13-16 semifinal, but lost to Austria in the 13/14 game to finish 14th of 18 teams.

Later years
The 1952 Summer Olympics and the 1955 EuroBasket are the last major international basketball tournaments that the country qualified for. Since then, it lost its international significance despite occasional strong showings at qualification games. E.g. Switzerland surprisingly beat former European Champion Russia at the qualification for the 2015 EuroBasket.

Competitive record

FIBA World Cup

Olympic Games

EuroBasket

Results and fixtures

2021

2022

2023

Team

Current roster
Roster for the EuroBasket 2025 Pre-Qualifiers matches on 23 and 26 February 2023 against Croatia and Poland.

Depth chart

Head coach position
 Sébastian Roduit – (2008–2012)
 Petar Aleksić – (2013–2017)
 Gianluca Barilari – (2017–2021)
 Ilias Papatheodorou – (2021–present)

Notable players
Thabo Sefolosha – First Swiss-born player to get drafted and play in the NBA.
Clint Capela

Past rosters
1935 EuroBasket: finished 4th among 10 teams

3 René Karlen, 4 Raymond Lambercy, 5 Mottier, 6 Jean Pare, 7 Radle, 8 Sidler, 9 Marcel Wuilleumier (Coach: ?)

1936 Olympic Games: finished 9th among 21 teams

1 Fernand Bergmann, 2 Pierre Carlier, 3 René Karlen, 4 Georges Laederach, 5 Raymond Lambercy, 6 Jean Pollet, 7 Jean Pare, 8 Marcel Wuilleumier (Coach: ?)

1946 EuroBasket: finished 5th among 10 teams

3 Georges Stockly, 4 Fernand Keller, 5 Theo Winkler, 7 Georges Gallay, 8 Henry Gujer, 10 Robert Geiser, 12 Jean Pollet, 13 Jean Pare, 15 René Wohler, 20 Louis Sanguin (Coach: ?)

1948 Olympic Games: finished 21st among 23 teams

3 Georges Stockly, 4 Henry Gujer, 5 Jean Pollet, 6 Maurice Chollet, 7 Claude Chevalley, 8 Pierre Albrecht, 9 Marcos Bossy, 10 Robert Geiser, 11 Jean Tribolet, 12 Claude Landini, 13 Jean Pare, 14 Bernard Dutoit, 15 Henri Baumann, 16 Gérald Piaget (Coach: ?)

1951 EuroBasket: finished 13th among 17 teams

3 Georges Stockly, 4 Henry Gujer, 5 Theo Winkler, 6 Arthur Bugna, 7 Henri Baumann, 8 Roger Domenjoz, 9 Marcos Bossy, 10 René Wohler, 11 René Chiappino, 12 Bernard Dutoit, 13 Albert Hermann, 14 Roger Prahin, 15 Francis Perroud (Coach: ?)

1952 Olympic Games: finished 20th among 23 teams

3 Georges Stockly, 4 Pierre Albrecht, 5 Jacques Redard, 6 Gérald Cottier, 7 Henri Baumann, 8 Roger Domenjoz, 9 Marcos Bossy, 10 René Wohler, 11 René Chiappino, 12 Marcel Moget, 13 Maurice Chollet, 14 Roger Prahin, 15 Bernard Schmied, 16 Jean-Pierre Voisin (Coach: ?)

1953 EuroBasket: finished 11th among 17 teams

3 André Laverniaz, 4 Pierre Albrecht, 5 Jacques Redard, 6 Henri Devaud, 7 Albert Hermann, 8 René Hofmann, 9 Marcos Bossy, 10 Gérald Cottier, 11 René Chiappino, 12 Jean Emery, 13 Pierre Wittwer, 14 Michel Currat, 15 Jean-Pierre Voisin, 16 Ruggero Balmelli (Coach: ?)

1955 EuroBasket: finished 14th among 18 teams

4 Pierre Albrecht, 5 Jacques Redard, 6 Michel Currat, 7 Henri Baumann, 8 V Bally, 9 C Sevelley, 10 Gérald Cottier, 11 Marcos Bossy, 12 René Chiappino, 13 M Etter, 14 C Lambrecht, 15 Jean-Pierre Voisin, 16 P Worte, 17 M Robert (Coach: ?)

Kit

Manufacturer
Erima
2017: Li-Ning
2018: 14Fourteen

Sponsor
2017: Tissot

See also

Sport in Switzerland
Switzerland women's national basketball team
Switzerland men's national under-20 basketball team
Switzerland men's national under-18 basketball team
Switzerland men's national under-16 basketball team
Switzerland men's national 3x3 team

Notes

References

External links
Official website 
Switzerland FIBA profile
Switzerland National Team – Men at Eurobasket.com
Switzerland Basketball Records at FIBA Archive

Videos
 Switzerland v Iceland – Full Game – EuroBasket 2022 Pre-Qualifiers Youtube.com video

 
Men's national basketball teams
1932 establishments in Switzerland